McMinnville may refer to:
McMinnville, Oregon, the county seat and largest city of Yamhill County, Oregon, United States
McMinnville, Tennessee, the largest city in and the county seat of Warren County, Tennessee, United States

See also
McMinnville UFO photographs
McMinnville and Manchester Railroad
McMinnville School District
McMinnville High School
McMinnville Opera House
McMinnville AVA